Fidirana is a town and commune in Madagascar. It belongs to the district of Mandoto, which is a part of Vakinankaratra Region. The population of the commune was estimated to be approximately 25,000 in 2001 commune census.

The Provincial road RIP 143 connects Fidirana with Ankazomiriotra].

Only primary schooling is available. The majority 50% of the population of the commune are farmers, while an additional 50% receives their livelihood from raising livestock. The most important crop is rice, while other important products are peanuts and maize.

References and notes 

Populated places in Vakinankaratra